Enrique Javier Borja Araújo (born 30 May 1995) is a Paraguayan professional footballer who plays as a forward for Atlético Tucumán, on loan from Sol de América.

Career
Borja started his career in Paraguay with Cerro Porteño, initially featuring for their U20 team. He made his professional bow during an away draw with General Díaz in April 2014, featuring for the last twenty-five minutes of what was his only appearance in the 2014 Paraguayan Primera División season. On 31 January 2015, Sportivo Luqueño loaned Borja. He scored his opening career goal during his first start on 25 February versus Deportivo Santaní. He returned to Cerro Porteño in June, subsequently scoring his first goal for the club in December during a win over Sol de América at the Estadio Feliciano Cáceres.

February 2016 saw the forward move to Brazilian football after agreeing a move to Resende. He netted a brace over Friburguense on his way to three strikes in nine matches in the Campeonato Carioca. Having returned to his parent club in mid-2016, Borja spent the rest of the year on loan at fellow Paraguayan Primera División team Guaraní. On 27 July 2017, Borja joined General Díaz. He ended the 2018 campaign with thirty-six appearances and sixteen goals. In December 2018, Borja signed a pre-contract agreement with Argentinos Juniors of the Argentine Primera División; effective from January 2019.

After thirteen appearances in eight months for Argentinos, Borja departed on loan in August 2019 to Belgrano of Primera B Nacional. He returned to his parent club in the succeeding January, prior to being loaned out to his homeland with Nacional. In 2021, Borja played for fellow league club Sportivo Luqueño, before signing with Sol de América ahead of the 2022 season. In July 2022, Borja once again moved to Argentina, signing a loan deal with Atlético Tucumán until the end of 2023 with a purchase option.

Career statistics
.

Honours
Guaraní
Primera División: 2016 Clausura

References

External links

1995 births
Living people
Paraguayan footballers
Paraguayan expatriate footballers
People from San Ignacio, Paraguay
Association football forwards
Paraguayan Primera División players
Argentine Primera División players
Primera Nacional players
Cerro Porteño players
Sportivo Luqueño players
Resende Futebol Clube players
Club Guaraní players
General Díaz footballers
Argentinos Juniors footballers
Club Atlético Belgrano footballers
Club Nacional footballers
Club Sol de América footballers
Atlético Tucumán footballers
Expatriate footballers in Brazil
Expatriate footballers in Argentina
Paraguayan expatriate sportspeople in Brazil
Paraguayan expatriate sportspeople in Argentina